Pascual Venegas Filardo (March 25, 1911 – June 4, 2003) was a Venezuelan poet, writer, and journalist.

1911 births
2003 deaths
Venezuelan male poets
Venezuelan journalists
20th-century Venezuelan poets
20th-century male writers
20th-century journalists